State Commissioner was the title for the provisional heads of government of the New states of Germany shortly after reunification.

German reunification took effect on 3 October 1990, when the German Democratic Republic joined the Federal Republic of Germany as five re-established states. However, elections for the state governments of these five states took place on 14 October 1990 and the Landtag of these states elected the respective Minister-Presidents from late October to early November. Between the reunification and the election of the respective Minister-President, appointed state commissioner took on the role of heads of government, as stipulated by the German Reunification Treaty.

These state commissioner also represented their respective state in the Bundesrat, but only had an advisory vote.

They had been appointed by Minister-President of the GDR Lothar de Maizière on 3 August 1990 as Landessprecher.  Most state commissioners had previously served as Regierungsbevollmächtigte for one of the Bezirke of the GDR that would later be re-organized to the New states; Brick for Neubrandenburg, Wolf for Potsdam, Krause for Leipzig and Duchač for Erfurt. There was some political controversy as to which Regierungsbevollmächtigter would become Landessprecher.

Except for Karl-Hermann Steinberg, who was revealed to have worked for the East German Stasi, all state commissioners were elected to the respective Landtag and were appointed state ministers:

  was appointed Minister for Food, Agriculture, Forestry and Fisheries of Mecklenburg-Vorpommern
 Jochen Wolf was appointed Minister for Urban Development, Housing and Transportation of Brandenburg
  was appointed State Minister of the Interior of Saxony

Josef Duchač succeeded himself as Minister-President of Thuringia.

State Commissioners

References 

Political history of Germany
1990 in Germany
East Germany
German reunification
Contemporary German history